Events from the year 2007 in North Korea.

Incumbents
Premier: Pak Pong-ju (until 11 April), Kim Yong-il (starting 11 April)
Supreme Leader: Kim Jong-il

Events
 2007 North Korean floods

References

Further reading
 

 
North Korea
Years of the 21st century in North Korea
2000s in North Korea
North Korea